Sidonia is a feminine given name. It may also refer to:

 579 Sidonia, an asteroid
 USS Sidonia (AKA-42), a U.S. Navy attack cargo ship
 Order of Sidonia, a chivalric order for women instituted by the Kingdom of Saxony
 Sidonie (Brumov-Bylnice), a district of Brumov-Bylnice, Czech Republic
 Sidonia, Tennessee, Weakley County, Tennessee
 Fromont and Risler, also titled Sidonie, an 1874 French novel
 Sidonia, a starship in Knights of Sidonia, a Japanese manga series by Tsutomu Nihei

See also
 Cydonia (Mars), a region on the planet Mars
 Duke of Medina Sidonia, a noble Spanish title
 Medina-Sidonia, a city and municipality in Spain
 Kydonia or Cydonia, an ancient city state on Crete